Acacia levata is a shrub belonging to the genus Acacia and the subgenus Juliflorae that is endemic to small arid area of western Australia.

Description
The glabrous branchlets are commonly sericeous at the extremities. Like most species of Acacia it has phyllodes rather than true leaves. The patent to ascending phyllodes have a narrowly elliptic to oblong-elliptic shape and are straight or shallowly curved. The simple inflorescences occur singly or in small groups in the axils. The pendent seed pods that form after flowering have a linear shape with narrow wings and are straight to slightly curved.

Distribution
It is native to a small area in the Pilbara region of Western Australia north of Newman and south of Marble Bar where it is often situated on hilltops and hillslopes growing in sandy or loamy soils over granite usually as a part of scrubland and spinifex communities and it is often associated with Acacia hilliana and Acacia stellaticeps.

See also
List of Acacia species

References

levata
Acacias of Western Australia
Taxa named by Bruce Maslin
Plants described in 1995